Khoro may refer to:

People
Khan Bahadur Muhammed Ayub Khoro, Chief Minister of Sindh, a province of Pakistan, in 1947–1948
Nisar Khoro, Pakistani politician, leader of the opposition in Provincial Assembly of Sindh, member of the Tehrik-e-Istiqlal party

Places
Khoro (rural locality), several rural localities in Russia

Other
Horo (dance), a Bulgarian folk dance
Khoro clan, a Hindu clan

See also
Horo (disambiguation)